Gymnusa is a genus of rove beetles in the subfamily Aleocharinae and tribe Gymnusini. The coloration of this genus is highly coherent, with most species black and a few dark, dark brown. They range in length from 4.2 millimeters to 6.5 millimeters.

Gymnusa live in semi-aquatic and aquatic environments, but never marine: they live in detritus in swamps, in bogs, streams, and slow-moving rivers. They live in the Nearctic and Palearctic in Europe and North America.

References

Aleocharinae genera
Beetles of North America
Beetles of Europe